Donagh O'Tighe (also known as Donat O'Teige) was a 16th century Irish prelate: he was Roman Catholic Archbishop of Armagh in 1560; and held the post until his death in 1562.

References

Roman Catholic archbishops of Armagh
1562 deaths
Year of birth unknown